Rajiv Gandhi (1944–1991) was an Indian politician.

Rajiv Gandhi may also refer to:

Colleges and research institutes in India
Rajiv Gandhi University of Health Sciences, Bangalore, Karnataka
Rajiv Gandhi Centre for Biotechnology, a research institute in Thiruvananthapuram, Kerala
Rajiv Gandhi Institute of Technology, Kottayam, an engineering college in Kerala
Rajiv Gandhi Technical University, a multi-campus technical institute in Madhya Pradesh
Rajiv Gandhi Institute of Technology, Mumbai, an engineering college affiliated to the University of Mumbai, Maharashtra
Rajiv Gandhi Medical College, Thane, Maharashtra
Rajiv Gandhi School of Intellectual Property Law, a law school based at the Indian Institute of Technology, Kharagpur, West Bengal

Other uses
Rajiv Gandhi Foundation, a charitable institution in India
Rajiv Gandhi International Airport, Hyderabad, Telangana, India
Rajiv Gandhi International Cricket Stadium, Hyderabad, Telangana, India
Rajiv Gandhi Khel Ratna, India's highest sporting honour
Rajiv Gandhi National Park (disambiguation), four national parks in India